David Kovačič (born 27 January 1999) is a Slovenian footballer who plays as a midfielder for Maryland Terrapins.

Career

Kovačič started his career with Slovenian top flight side Krško, where he made 67 appearances and scored 1 goal. On 25 October 2016, Kovačič debuted for Krško during a 1-2 loss to Domžale. On 19 September 2017, he scored his first goal for Krško during a 2-3 loss to Maribor. In 2019, Kovačič joined the Maryland Terrapins in the United States.

References

External links

 
 

Slovenian footballers
Expatriate soccer players in the United States
Living people
Association football midfielders
1999 births
Slovenian PrvaLiga players
NK Krško players
Maryland Terrapins men's soccer players
Slovenian expatriate sportspeople in the United States
Slovenian expatriate footballers